The Co-Cathedral of the Merciful Father  also called Co-Cathedral of Zaporizhzhia is the name given to a religious building that is affiliated with the Catholic Church and is located in the city of Zaporizhzhia in the European country of Ukraine.

The cathedral follows the Roman or Latin rite and serves as the co-cathedral of the Roman Catholic Diocese of Kharkiv-Zaporizhzhia (Dioecesis Kharkiviensis-Zaporizhiensis, Харківсько-Запорізька дієцезія) which was created in 2002 by bull "Ad plenius prospiciendum" of Pope John Paul II. Its history dates back to April 5, 1998 when he was blessed plot of land for future building by Bishop Stanislaw Padewski. On October 7, 1999 the first stone in the presence of Bishop Leon Dubrawski, sent from Rome is placed. The church was designed by architects of Ukraine, partly following the model of the Basilica of St. Peter's in Rome. On August 7, 2004, the cathedral was consecrated by the bishops Stanisław Padewski, Leon Dubrawski, among others

See also
Roman Catholicism in Ukraine
Co-Cathedral
List of cathedrals in Ukraine

References

Roman Catholic cathedrals in Ukraine
Buildings and structures in Zaporizhzhia
Roman Catholic churches completed in 2004